Tasersuatsiaup Qaa Peninsula is a peninsula of Greenland. It is located in the Upernavik Archipelago.

Peninsulas of the Upernavik Archipelago